The Bloomington metropolitan area may refer to:

The Bloomington metropolitan area, Illinois, United States
The Bloomington metropolitan area, Indiana, United States

See also
Bloomington (disambiguation)